Black Box Music is an independent music and artist development company based out of Mississauga, Ontario, Canada. Originally operating under Black Box Recordings, the company began exclusively as a record label in 2004. It has since expanded to include management and publishing services in recent years, prompting the brand change in 2008. The Black Box Recordings brand now exists as the record label sector of Black Box Music's full-service approach.

History
Established in 2004, Black Box Music is one of Canada's independent music companies with teams in Toronto, Ontario and Los Angeles, California. Black Box Music consists of a record label, artist management, and publishing branches. Black Box Music's artist roster includes SonReal, The Glorious Sons, Justin Nozuka, JUNO-winning JJ Wilde, hip-hop artist Classified, rapper and producer Rich Kidd, The OBGMs, MAGGIE ANDREW, Marina Lin, Kennen, yung sum, Northcote, Young Clancy, and Canadian rock band Glass Tiger frontman Alan Frew.

As Black Box Music's scope expanded, so did company involvement in the careers of signed artists, later leading to the launch of the company in artist management. Over time, Black Box Music's artist management and publishing initiatives have grown to include external artists of various styles and genres that are not signed to the Black Box record label.

Artists

Label (current)
SonReal
The Glorious Sons
Justin Nozuka
JJ Wilde
Kennen
Marina Lin
The OBGMs
yung sum
Willa

Label (alumni)
Rosesdead 
Sydney
Summer Hero
Ten Second Epic 
The Fullblast 
The Wolfnote
Brighter Brightest 
Crash Parallel
DreamFace
Living With Lions 
Shad 
The Provincial Archive 
The Wooden Sky
Classified
Rich Kidd
Northcote
MAGGIE ANDREW
Young Clancy

Management 
 The Glorious Sons
 JJ Wilde
 Blanco Brown
 Northcote
 Alan Frew of Glass Tiger

Discography

Awards and nominations

References 

Record labels established in 2003
Canadian independent record labels
Companies based in Mississauga